Explicit Multi-Threading  (XMT) is a computer science paradigm for building and programming parallel computers designed around the parallel random-access machine (PRAM) parallel computational model. A more direct explanation of XMT starts with the rudimentary abstraction that made serial computing simple: that any single instruction available for execution in a serial program executes immediately. A consequence of this abstraction is a step-by-step (inductive) explication of the instruction available next for execution. A consequence of ICE is a step-by-step (inductive) explication of the instructions available next for concurrent execution. Moving beyond the serial von Neumann computer (the only successful general-purpose platform to date), the aspiration of XMT is that computer science will again be able to augment mathematical induction with a simple one-line computing abstraction.

The random-access machine (RAM) is an abstract machine model used in computer science to study algorithms and complexity for standard serial computing. The PRAM computational model is an abstract parallel machine model that had been introduced to similarly study parallel algorithms and complexity for parallel computing, when they were yet to be built. Researchers have developed a large body of knowledge of parallel algorithms for the PRAM model. These parallel algorithms are also known for being simple, by standards of other approaches to parallel algorithms.

This large body of parallel algorithms knowledge for the PRAM model and their relative simplicity motivated building computers whose programming can be guided by these parallel algorithms. Since productivity of parallel programmers has long been considered crucial for the success a parallel computer, simplicity of  algorithms is important.

Multi-core computers are built around two or more processor cores integrated on a single integrated circuit die. They are widely used across many application domains including general-purpose computing.
Explicit Multi-Threading (XMT) is a computing paradigm for building and programming multi-core computers with tens, hundreds or thousands of processor cores.

Experimental work published in 2011 and 2012 demonstrates significantly greater speedups for advanced PRAM algorithms on XMT prototypes than for the same problems on state-of-the-art multi-core computers.

Work published in 2018 shows that lock-step parallel programming (using ICE) can achieve the same performance as the fastest hand-tuned multi-threaded code on XMT systems. Such inductive lock-step approach stands in contrast to multi-threaded programming approaches of many other core systems that are known for challenging programmers.

The XMT paradigm was introduced by Uzi Vishkin.

The main levels of abstraction of XMT
The Explicit Multi-Threading (XMT) computing paradigm integrates several levels of abstraction.

In the WT framework, a parallel algorithm is first described in terms of parallel rounds. For each round, the operations to be performed are characterized, but several issues can be suppressed. For example, the number of operations at each round need not be clear, processors need not be mentioned and any information that may help with the assignment of processors to jobs need not be accounted for. Second, the suppressed information is provided. The WT framework is useful since while it can greatly simplify the initial description of a parallel algorithm, inserting the details suppressed by that initial description is often not very difficult.

The XMT paradigm can be programmed using XMTC, a parallel multi-threaded programming language which is a small extension of the programming language C. The XMT paradigm include a programmer's workflow that starts with casting an algorithm in the WT framework and proceeds to programming it in XMTC.

The XMT multi-core computer systems provides run-time load-balancing of multi-threaded programs incorporating several patents. One of them  generalizes the program counter concept, which is central to the von Neumann architecture to multi-core hardware.

XMT prototyping and links to more information
In January 2007, a 64-processor computer  named Paraleap, that demonstrates the overall concept was completed. Since making parallel programming easy is one of the biggest challenges facing computer science today, the demonstration also sought to include teaching the basics of PRAM algorithms and XMTC programming to students ranging from high-school  to graduate school.

Each reported speedup was obtained by comparing clock cycles on an XMT prototype relative to the fastest serial algorithm running on the fastest serial machines.

This 2018 result sharpens the contrast between XMT programming and the multi-threaded programming approaches employed by nearly all many other-core systems, whose race conditions and other demands tend to challenge, and sometimes even fail programmers .

References
.
.
 
 
.

.
.
 
.
.
.
.
.
.
.

Notes

External links
 Home page of the XMT project, with links to a software release, on-line tutorial and to material for teaching parallelism.

Parallel computing
Distributed computing architecture